Clyde Mark Billington Jr. (August 29, 1934 – April 2, 2018) was an American chemist, businessman, and politician.

Billington was born in Hartford, Connecticut and went to Weaver High School. Billington was an African-American. He received his bachelor of science degree form Lincoln University, in Chester County, Pennsylvania. He served in the United States Army in the Chemical Corps. He then worked as a chemist for Pratt & Whitney. Billington was in the real estate and liquor businesses in Hartford, Connecticut. Billington served in the Connecticut House of Representatives as a Democrat from 1971 to 1979. Billington died at St. Francis Hospital in Hartford, Connecticut.

Notes

1934 births
2018 deaths
Politicians from Hartford, Connecticut
Military personnel from Connecticut
Lincoln University (Pennsylvania) alumni
African-American chemists
Businesspeople from Connecticut
African-American state legislators in Connecticut
Democratic Party members of the Connecticut House of Representatives
20th-century American businesspeople
20th-century African-American people
21st-century African-American people